Nina Alexandrovna Ostanina (born 26 December 1955) is a Russian Communist politician. She has been a member of the State Duma since 1995.

She was Secretary of the Kemerovo regional Communist party organization.

Career 
She was an unsuccessful candidate for governor of Kemerovo Oblast in the 1997 Russian gubernatorial elections.

She was one of the 324 members of the State Duma sanctioned by the United States Treasury in March 2022 in response to the 2022 Russian invasion of Ukraine. 

In July 2022, she co-sponsored a bill that would ban "the denial of family values" and the promotion of "non-traditional sexual orientations." In an interview, she further stated that "a traditional family is a union of a man and woman, it’s children, it’s a multi-generational family."

References 

Living people
1955 births
Third convocation members of the State Duma (Russian Federation)
Fourth convocation members of the State Duma (Russian Federation)
Fifth convocation members of the State Duma (Russian Federation)
Sixth convocation members of the State Duma (Russian Federation)
Seventh convocation members of the State Duma (Russian Federation)
Eighth convocation members of the State Duma (Russian Federation)
20th-century Russian women politicians
20th-century Russian politicians
21st-century Russian women politicians
Altai State University alumni
People from Kemerovo Oblast

Russian individuals subject to the U.S. Department of the Treasury sanctions